Mathias Collett (10 September 1708  –  24 March 1759) was a Norwegian civil servant. 

Collett was born in Christiania (now Oslo), Norway. He was the son of merchant and city captain James Collett (1687-1724) and Karen Berg (1687-1744). He was the grandson of English-born, Norwegian merchant James Collett (1655–1727).

He served as County Governor of Finmarkens amt (now Finnmark) from 1750 to 1757, and County Governor of Christians Amt (now Oppland) from 1757 to 1759.

See also
Collett family

References

1708 births
1759 deaths
Civil servants from Oslo
Mathias
County governors of Norway
Norwegian people of English descent